Cyril Henry Barraud (1877–1965) was a British artist. He was the son of Herbert Rose Barraud and nephew of Francis Barraud.

After education at Downside School, he trained at Brighton School of Art and then worked as a manager at his father's photographic business before becoming a full-time artist.  He was close to Francis Barraud and helped him with the final version of "His Master's Voice".

His principal medium was etching. He taught Canadian artist Walter J. Phillips etching skills. He exhibited at the Royal Academy between 1912 and 1924.

His work covers landscapes in Suffolk, Essex, Kent, the Thames Estuary and Rye. He also painted and etched:
 London street-scenes
 popular destinations close to the London and North Eastern Railway to be used as carriage prints
 cathedrals
 churches
 industrial buildings (notably interiors of Dunston Power Station)
 illustrations
 Christmas Cards

During the First World War he was commissioned in The Queen's Own Cameron Highlanders of Canada (43 Battalion) and, after being wounded in the left leg, was posted to the Canadian War Office as an official war artist.

He was married twice, first to Gladys Seanor (two children) and, after her death, to Evelyn Dixon.

References

19th-century English painters
English male painters
20th-century English painters
British war artists
1877 births
1965 deaths
Artists' Rifles soldiers
19th-century English male artists
20th-century English male artists